Alestopetersius conspectus is a species of African tetras found in Kwilu River in the middle Congo River basin in the Democratic Republic of the Congo.

References

Alestidae
Fish of Africa
Taxa named by José Justin Mbimbe Maye Munene
Taxa named by Melanie Stiassny
Fish described in 2012